was a Japanese samurai of the early Edo period. He was a retainer and karō in the service of the Shimazu clan of Satsuma Domain.

Hirata took part in Battle of Sekigahara. After Western Army lost the war, he saved Shimazu Yoshihiro's wife and Shimazu Iehisa's wife, let them go back to Satsuma safely.

Shimazu clan decided to invade Ryukyu Kingdom in 1609, Hirata Masumune was appointed vice general. The invasion of Ryukyu was successful, Satsuma troops captured King Shō Nei and his ministers, and took them to Kagoshima. But Hirata got involved in family conflict of Shimazu clan, and was murdered by Oshikawa Kimichika in the next year.

See also 
 Kabayama Hisataka

References

1566 births
1610 deaths
Samurai
Shimazu clan
Karō